A Pencil to the Jugular is a 2021 Mexican-Australian drama film set during the COVID-19 lockdowns in Melbourne. It is the second installment in a 2020 trilogy of feature films directed by Matthew Victor Pastor. The film premiered at the 43rd Moscow International Film Festival in April 2021. The film was co-written by Lorena Zarate.

Synopsis  
In March 2020 amid the COVID-19 pandemic in Australia, an ensemble of young migrants' lives fall apart. Through the chaos these lives will cross paths and a pencil will be taken to the jugular.

Cast  
 Lorena Zarate as Libra
 Felise Morales as Amanda
Shirong Wu as Ying

Reception 
Panos Kotzathanasis of Asian Movie Pulse has said in a review "A Pencil in the Jugular is an uneven film, which can be beautiful at times, features interesting characters and well presented social comments, but suffers from lack of restraint."

Conception
The film is a reaction to the rise of global hate crimes towards Asians during the COVID-19 pandemic. Pastor has stated in inquirer.net “multicultural communities can stand in solidarity … and allow us (Asians) to write ourselves into history.”

Pastor has also mentioned in an interview with The Swanston Gazette that he is interested in editing a five-hour version of the trilogy making the future, present and past elements of the three films into a singular vision edit with a runtime of 320 minutes. The 5 hour version of the film may act as a full vision.

References

External links 
 

2021 drama films
2021 films
Australian drama films
Mexican drama films
2020s English-language films
Films about the COVID-19 pandemic
Films set in Melbourne
Films set in 2020
COVID-19 pandemic in Australia